The 1981 NBL Finals was the postseason tournament of the National Basketball League's 1981 season, which began in February. The finals began on 27 June. The tournament concluded with the Launceston Casino City defeating the Nunawading Spectres in the NBL Grand Final on 28 June.

Format
The NBL finals series in 1981 consisted of two semi-final games, and one championship-deciding grand final. The finals were contested between the top four teams of the regular season, with the finals weekend hosted at the neutral Apollo Entertainment Centre in Adelaide.

Qualification

Qualified teams

Ladder

The NBL tie-breaker system as outlined in the NBL Rules and Regulations states that in the case of an identical win–loss record, the results in games played between the teams will determine order of seeding.

1St. Kilda Saints chose to participate in the 1981 FIBA Club World Cup in Brazil, instead of the 1981 NBL Finals. They were replaced by the Brisbane Bullets.

24-way Head-to-Head between West Adelaide Bearcats (5-1), Nunawading Spectres (3-3), Brisbane Bullets (2-4) and Newcastle Falcons (2-4).

3Head-to-Head between Brisbane Bullets and Newcastle Falcons (1-1). Brisbane Bullets won For and Against (+15).

4Head-to-Head between Coburg Giants and Bankstown Bruins (1-1). Coburg Giants won For and Against (+24).

Bracket

Semi-finals

|- bgcolor="#CCCCFF" font size=1
!width=120| Date
!width=180| Home
!width=50| Score
!width=180| Away
!width=70| Box Score

Grand Final

|- bgcolor="#CCCCFF" font size=1
!width=120| Date
!width=180| Home
!width=50| Score
!width=180| Away
!width=70| Box Score

See also
 1981 NBL season

References

Finals
National Basketball League (Australia) Finals